Panfilo Nuvolone (1581–1651) was an Italian painter of the Mannerist period, who painted both religious and still life topics, active in Cremona and Mantua.

Born to a Mantuan gentleman, he was the father of a family of Cremonese painters. In that town, he apprenticed with Giovanni Battista Trotti (known as il Malosso). Afterwards he moved to Milan, where fresco church ceilings, and painted altarpieces and still lifes.

One of his few documented still lifes depict a bowl of peaches, and recalls the near-contemporary paintings of fruit bowls in Milan, including the 1594-98 painting in the Ambrosiana by Caravaggio and similarly themed paintings by Fede Galizia. His son, Carlo Francesco Nuvolone, also a prominent in painter in Lombardy. Panfilo's younger son Giuseppe Nuvolone also a painter. Giuseppe's son Carlo was a mediocre quadratura specialist active mainly around Cremona.

Sources

 Grove Encyclopedia entry
 ‘’Cain and Abel’’

External links
Painters of reality: the legacy of Leonardo and Caravaggio in Lombardy, an exhibition catalog from The Metropolitan Museum of Art (fully available online as PDF), which contains material on Nuvolone (see index)

1581 births
1651 deaths
Painters from Mantua
16th-century Italian painters
Italian male painters
17th-century Italian painters
Painters from Milan
Italian Mannerist painters
Italian still life painters